The Alien Naturalization Act, Sess. 2, ch. 69, was a May 9, 1918 Act of the 65th United States Congress. 

More than 192,000 aliens were naturalized between May 9, 1918-June 30, 1919, under this act. It allowed aliens that were serving in the U.S. armed forces during "the present war" to file petitions for naturalization without making declarations of intent or proving 5 years' residence (requirements at the time).

References

65th United States Congress
1918 in law